Cliffside is an unincorporated community and census-designated place (CDP) in southeastern Rutherford County, North Carolina, United States. Its population was 611 as of the 2010 census. Cliffside has a post office with ZIP code 28024. U.S. Route 221 Alternate and North Carolina Highway 120 pass through the community.

Demographics

History 
Cliffside was founded by Raleigh Rutherford (R.R.) Haynes, who established a textile mill there on the Second Broad River. High Shoals, a former community in this vicinity, was a post office as early as 1828.

Cliffside Public School was added to the National Register of Historic Places in 1998.

References

External links
 Films of Cliffside, NC, by H. Lee Waters, 1937 and 1940.

Census-designated places in North Carolina
Census-designated places in Rutherford County, North Carolina
Unincorporated communities in North Carolina
Unincorporated communities in Rutherford County, North Carolina